Katie Webster (January 11, 1936 – September 5, 1999), born Kathryn Jewel Thorne, was an American boogie-woogie pianist.

Career
Webster was initially best known as a session musician behind Louisiana musicians on the Excello and Goldband record labels, such as Lightnin' Slim and Lonesome Sundown. She also played piano with Otis Redding in the 1960s, but after his death went into semi-retirement.

In the 1980s she was repeatedly booked for European tours and recorded albums for the German record label, Ornament Records, with Gary Wiggins and Chris Rannenberg - The International Blues Duo. She cut You Know That's Right with the band Hot Links, and the album that established her in the United States; The Swamp Boogie Queen with guest spots by Bonnie Raitt and Robert Cray. Two-Fisted Mama! was released in 1989. She performed at both the San Francisco Blues Festival and Long Beach Blues Festival.

Webster suffered a stroke in 1993 while touring Greece but returned to performing the following year. She died from heart failure in League City, Texas, in September 1999.

See also
List of swamp blues musicians
List of Louisiana blues musicians
New Orleans rhythm and blues
Music of Louisiana
Swamp blues
List of New Orleans blues musicians
Louisiana blues

References

External links
 
 Biography at Alligator.com

1936 births
1999 deaths
American blues singers
American blues pianists
American blues drummers
Boogie-woogie pianists
Musicians from Houston
Blues musicians from New Orleans
Swamp blues musicians
Louisiana blues musicians
20th-century American women pianists
20th-century American pianists
Singers from Louisiana
20th-century American women singers
Singers from Texas
Alligator Records artists
20th-century American singers